Melindea is a genus of leaf beetles in the subfamily Eumolpinae. It is known from Africa.

Species
 Melindea abyssinica Lefèvre, 1884
 Melindea brunnea (Jacoby, 1901)
 Melindea denticrus (Burgeon, 1941)
 Melindea ferruginipes (Weise, 1924)
 Melindea limbata (Pic, 1923)
 Melindea nigripes (Bryant, 1954)
 Melindea nigrita (Jacoby, 1901)
 Melindea nigritarsis (Bryant, 1954)
 Melindea opaca (Weise, 1915)
 Melindea pubescens (Bryant, 1941)
 Melindea robusta (Pic, 1923)
 Melindea rufescens (Pic, 1950)
 Melindea semifulva (Bryant, 1954)
 Melindea virescens (Lefèvre, 1885)

References

Eumolpinae
Chrysomelidae genera
Beetles of Africa
Taxa named by Édouard Lefèvre